Lake Wörth may refer to:
Wörthsee, a glacial lake in the Starnberg district of Bavaria, Germany
Wörthersee, an alpine lake in the southern Austrian state of Carinthia